Yarisley Collado Lufriu (also Yanisley; born 30 April 1985; other sources state 5 May 1985) is a female discus thrower from Cuba. Her personal best is 64.10 metres, achieved in May 2009 in Fortaleza.

She competed at the 2009 World Championships without reaching the final. She also won the silver medal at the 2009 Central American and Caribbean Championships.

Personal bests
Discus throw: 64.10 m –  Fortaleza, 10 May 2009

Achievements

References

External links
Tilastopaja biography

1985 births
Living people
Cuban female discus throwers
21st-century Cuban women